Taurolema dalensi is a species of beetle in the family Cerambycidae. It was described by Touroult and Tavakilian in 2006. It is known from French Guiana.

References

Mauesiini
Beetles described in 2006